Nils-Göran Areskoug (born Sundin on 18 May 1951, Växjö, Sweden), is a Swedish physician, musicologist, composer, author and interdisciplinary scholar.

Early life and education
Areskoug trained as a medical doctor, and was certified as cantor and organist at the Lund Cathedral in 1968. Early music teachers in Växjö included Nils Andersson, Ture Olsson, Janis Ozolins, Sylvia Mang-Borenberg, and Ladis and Boiana Müller. He studied musicology with Martin Tegen and literature with E.N. Tigerstedt at Stockholm University (from 1970), was supervised in his doctoral studies by Ingmar Bengtsson at Uppsala University (1974) and mentored by Bo Wallner at Royal University College of Music, Stockholm. As a pianist he studied at the Mozarteum University of Salzburg with Hans Leygraf in 1969 and as a conductor with Sergiu Celibidache, in Mainz, Stuttgart and Munich, from 1978 to 1995. As a composer Areskoug attended seminars with mentors such as Olivier Messiaen in Paris 1973, and György Ligeti in Stockholm, during the 1970s. He studied philosophy and aesthetics in Lund, Uppsala and, at the doctoral level, at University of Lausanne (UNIL), until 1993.

After early essays in Smålandsposten, Areskoug worked as a cultural critic for Svenska Dagbladet, 1977–1980, and as an academic teacher. Following supervision by leadership philosopher Peter Koestenbaum, Areskoug served, in 1986, as the first director of Kronoberg County Music Foundation (Stiftelsen Musik i Kronoberg), in Växjö. The popular success of his 1984 book on music led to his election as a member of the Swedish Authors' Association.

After medical studies at Lund University and Karolinska Institutet, Stockholm, Areskoug took up the philosophy of science at the intersection between neuroscience and psychoanalysis (and music psychotherapy), conducting dialogues with colleagues such as Dr. med. Erich Franzke in Växjö, Carl Lesche and Bertil Edgardh in Stockholm and, later, Adam Zweig, Carl Rudolf Pfaltz, and Raymond Battegay in Zürich and Basel. Areskoug's 1988 Cand. Med. Thesis at Lund University dealt with the controversy surrounding Adolf Grünbaum's critique of psychoanalysis. It was approved by Professors Lars Janzon, Bengt Scherstén and Germund Hesslow, Lund University Faculty of Medicine, at a public hearing on 1 January 1989 in the Institute of Social Medicine, Malmö University Hospital (MAS), with acclaims:  Areskoug's paper is on a very high scientific level, (Hesslow). It is rare to read something so clear in medical context (Ingvar).

Career and achievements
On 28 May 1996, the Harvard University Professor David Lewin stated on Areskoug's research in music: I am greatly impressed. ...There is no mistaking the drive, energy, and productivity that mark a scholar of truly exceptional status. He is not afraid to tackle the really big issues of art and creativity. His scholarly equipment is certainly adequate for this task. Given that qualification, what counts is the drive and determination... And in this respect, Dr. Areskoug is formidable.

Encouraged by the philosophers Georg Henrik von Wright and Paul Feyerabend to pursue his studies of the process of interpretation in sciences and the arts which were viewed by Eduard Marbach at University of Bern as an unorthodox contribution to phenomenologic research, Areskoug spoke at University of Helsinki on invitation of Eero Tarasti. Professor Raymond Monelle, Reader at University of Edinburgh, Scotland, officially appointed evaluator of Areskoug's scholarly work on three occasions, summarized: This was the most elaborate theory of interpretation I had ever seen.
 
Areskoug was invited to give a speech at University of California, San Diego (UCSD), in 1983, where Nobel Laureate Hannes Alfvén inspired him to pursue talks across disciplines. Visiting Collegium Helveticum ETH Zurich its directors, Professors Helga Nowotny and Yehuda Elkana, encouraged him to propose an arena for transdisciplinary dialogues across sciences and arts in society, a Collegium Europaeum. He held transdisciplinary dialogues on creativity and extrascientific sources of inspiration with Nobel Laureates at the Nobel Foundation centennial celebration in Stockholm, in 2001. He was an expert evaluator for the European Commission in Life sciences, in Brussels 1999; he served as expert advisor to Schweizerischer Nationalfonds (SNF), as peer review evaluator to the Arts & Sciences program of City of Vienna fund for science, research and technology, in 2008, and as an expert reviewer at Torsten och Ragnar Söderbergs stiftelser, Stockholm. He lectured on themes such as knowledge integration across disciplines, on "reflexivity" (a term adopted by George Soros) in financial interpretation at Stockholm School of Economics, on strategic policy at Centre for Advanced Study in Leadership (CASL), and engaged himself in the public debate on development of the research infrastructure of higher education in Sweden. In 1997, a top level strategic manager in a Swedish financial industry, wrote:...he has a superior mind in integrative analysis.

During his year in Norway (1997–1998) at BI Norwegian Business School, Areskoug developed a model of contextual value conversion, an integrated view on patterns of interpretation across fields of practice, founded in cognitive neuroepistemology. Silje A. Sundt reported the focus areas of such translational research, in Norwegian Finansavisen on 16 August 1997: There, he sees interpretive processes as the common denominator behind reflected and intuitive decision, in practice and theory and, in life, art and business. A symphony orchestra is a perfect model for the interaction and leadership of organizations, and in society. In political leadership, public funding, corporate management and private financial markets investors are creating macroeconomic value to the extent that a comprehensive set of valid criteria for values (human, health, environmental, social, cultural, etc.) are attended to in interpretive paradigm and in interactive socioeconomic action, as elaborated in Financial Interpretation Research (FIR). She quoted Areskoug: Conducting a symphony orchestra takes subtle interaction and leadership to function well, and so does managing a business.

On 29 December 2000, the Chairman of the EU European Consultative Forum on the Environment and Sustainable Development, Professor Uno Svedin, in charge of interdisciplinary activities as a Director of Research at Swedish Council for Planning and Coordination of Research (FRN), wrote:
Nils-Göran Areskoug has always shown a strong interest in these ways of approaching science and has during years been very active at the international level in trying to promote these forms of research. This includes a considerably number of presentations as invited speaker in international events on such issues latest in the beginning of the year 2000 at the large conference in Zurich. He has also written considerable on such topics. As an example, at the major INES international conference in June 2000, in Stockholm, he contributed substantially to the qualified debate on inter- and transdisciplinary.

Concerned over a widening gap between power and competence in society, Areskoug participated in the political debate on human rights and social health in Sweden. He initiated Alliance for the Child to promote a social policy for quality in parenting. As a remedy for such imbalances, and to improve quality of life, he suggested an online competence and information resource center devoted to counteracting psychosocial maltreatment of children. He proposed a social policy initiative to European governments in order to coordinate a European centre for education, research, prevention, intervention and rehabilitation of victims of emotional abuse. In social sciences he adopted a medical perspective in his analyses. Areskoug engaged himself in Scholars at Risk against persecution of scholars, and warned against competence deficit among authorities, perils of populism, lack of protection of intellectual freedom and the risk to open society of such ideologies as extreme feminism, in Scandinavia.

Family background
Nils-Göran Areskoug is a member of the Arreskow family and contributed to researching its history and cultural heritage.

Publications

Books
Areskoug is the author of eight full size books and numerous articles covering fields such as the history, aesthetics and analysis of classical music; as well as on the epistemology of transdisciplinary sciences and strategic cognition. A series of his works were published under the motto "In Your innermost soul all is music".
Among reviews, the first volume in the series Musical Interpretation Research (MIR), was examined by Pehr Sällström in his Tecken att tänka med.

On 10 April 1995, Professor Matti Vainio concluded his evaluation for University of Jyväskylä:His publications, which total over 3.000 pages, also demonstrate many times over his ability for independent scientific research. We must also not forget his practical involvement in the field of music as a performing artist, a conductor and a composer.The empirical part of Areskoug's theory of musical interpretation relies on a series of structured interviews and/or interactive dialogues with top music performers, mainly conductors, pianists and other instrumentalists, including (inter alea): Antal Dorati, Silvio Varviso, Herbert Blomstedt, Isaac Stern (completed list in Musical Interpretation Research, MIR)

On 20 June 1996, Professors Gunnar Danbolt, Trond Berg Eriksen, Morten Nøjgaard, and Göran Hermerén, the evaluation committee for the appointment of a professorship in general aesthetics at University of Oslo, concluded: The doctoral thesis is no doubt a great scholarly achievement.

Music
Areskoug has composed music for piano, songs and chamber ensembles, as well as several works for orchestra. As a performer he is known to appear at occasional improvised concerts and recitals on piano and at rare events as a conductor. His Symphony for Peace for symphony orchestra and choir with poems by former UN General Secretary Dag Hammarskjöld, commissioned by Stockholm Bishop Krister Stendahl, was premiered at the Stockholm Cathedral, in 1985.

His music won public recognition: In June 1985, Finnish-Swedish philosopher and psychoanalyst Carl Lesche, Stockholm, evaluated: "I was present at the final rehearsal of the premiere of his Symphony for Peace, recently performed in the Stockholm Cathedral, and can bear witness that it is a deeply felt and expressive work of substantial musical worth". The anthropologist Ann Lilljequist of Stockholm University, also at the premiere, said: "This was something unbelievably fine" The first horn player in the orchestra, at the same occasion, said: "This was the finest thing I can recall having experienced".

Among professionals, professors such as J.-Claude Piguet, David Lewin, and Radovan Lorkovic widely acclaimed his style of composition. Maestro Sergiu Celibidache concluded, in the circle of his colleagues, on Areskoug: One of the most intelligent of us all, a highly educated, sensitive and musical person – nothing prevents him from becoming a conductor; and in a handwritten note to his mentee:A new source of light has been set free in you – may God be your guide.

Written works
Publications archived online by ETH Institutional Repository "e-collection", at: .

Titles under author name Areskoug or Sundin selected from Aremus, Libris, Worldcat or KIT Library (KVK):
 Karlheinz Stockhausen - Gruppen für drei Orchester, Uppsala: Uppsala university, 1973, in Swedish, 69 pages, Institute of Musicology, Uppsala university.
 Introduktion till musikalisk interpretation och interpretationsforskning, Stockholm, Mirage, cop. 1982 (2nd edition: 1984), in Swedish (introduction and chapter in English), 364 pages, Series: Musical interpretation research, 0349-988X ; 1.
 Musikalisk interpretationsanalys, Stockholm: Mirage, 1983, in Swedish, 453 pages, Series: Musical interpretation research, ISSN 0349-988X ; 2.
 Musical interpretation in performance - excerpts from Musical interpretation research, MIR vols. 1-2, Växjö : Mirage, 1983, In English, 96 pages, Series: Musical interpretation research, 0349-988X; [3].
 Verkstudier - musikalisk analys, teori, pedagogik, Växjö: Mirage, 1984, in Swedish, 127 pages.
 Myter om musikens ursprung, Stockholm: Mirage, 1983, in Swedish.
 Skapande interpretation och musikalisk instudering, Stockholm : Mirage, 1983, in Swedish.
 Strindberg och musiken - Brott och brott, Spöksonaten och Beethovens op 31:2, in Swedish, Stockholm : Mirage, 1983, 13 pages.
 Bilder ur musikens historia - romantiken och vår tid, ,Växjö: Mirage, 1984, in Swedish, 203 pages.
 Musical interpretation in performance: music theory, musicology and musical consciousness, in: J. Smith (editor): Journal of Musicological Research, Vol. 5, 1984: pages 99–129, Gordon and Breach Science Publishers Inc. and OPA Ltd, UK. ISSN 0141-1896/84/0503-0093.
 Five music essays, Stockholm: Mirage, 1987, in English, 65 pages.
 Systems cognition and phenomenology of interpretation in performance, in: George E. Lasker, Jane Lily, James Rhodes (editors): Proceedings of the 2000 Symposium on Systems Research in the Arts, The 12th International Conference on Systems Research, Informatics and Cybernetics, July 31-August 5, 2000, Baden-Baden, Germany, Volume II. , .
 Science and the arts – Trespassing the last taboo toward a phenomenology of interpretation in performance, “Quality Criteria”  in: “Transdisciplinarity: Joint Problem-Solving among Science, Technology and Society” under “Quality Criteria” (II:374-379, 2000), ETHZ Zürich; (7 pages).
 Aesthetic criteria - intentional content in musical interpretation in contemporary music, in English, In: International Conference on Cognitive Musicology (1 : 1993 : Jyväskylä): Proceedings of the First International Conference on Cognitive, edited by Jukka Louhivuori, Jouko Laaksamo; 2. ed., Jyväskylä : Univ. of Jyväskylä, Dept. of Music, 1994. Series: Jyväskylän yiopiston musiikkitieteen laitoksen julkaisusarja. A, Tutkielmia ja raportteja, 0359-629X ; 11;  ; pages 330-336.
 Aesthetic criteria of musical interpretation in contemporary performance of instrumental music, in English, In: Stockholm Music Acoustics Conference (1993): SMAC 93 / Anders Friberg et al., editors, Stockholm : Royal Swedish Academy of Music (Kungl. Musikaliska akad.) 1994, Publications, 0347-5158 ; 79,  ; pages 551-555.
 Aesthetic criteria for musical interpretation - a study of the contemporary performance of Western notated instrumental music after 1750, Jyväskylä : Univ. of Jyväskylä, 1994, in English, 665 pages, Series: Jyväskylä studies in the arts, ISSN 0075-4633; 45, Dissertation, PhD Thesis, Jyväskylä University, Finland.
 Aesthetic Experience and Organizational Change - a Musical Model for Managerial Cognition, in: Innovative Management Research, EURAM, European Academy of Management II, Stockholm (May 9–11, 2002); (14 pages).
 Föräldraalienation och Psykosocial Barnmisshandel, in: Inre och Yttre Verklighet, in: Acta Academiae Stromstadiensis, AAS-1, Antologi 2011, Strömstad akademi, pages 36–49, editors: Aadu Ott, Anders Steene och Gunnar Windahl, and Lars Broman, layout, Strömstad, Sweden, .
 Vetenskap som vandring till verkligheten. Hommage till en vördad mentor, in: Bredd och djup. Strömstad akademi presenterar sig, in: Acta Academiae Stromstadiensis, AAS-3, Antologi 2012, Strömstad akademi, pages 38–40, editor: Gunnar Windahl, Strömstad, Sweden, .
 Konst och Vetenskap i Samspel - ("till minnet av Sture Linnér"), (Arts and Sciences in Interplay - in memory of Sture Linnér), in: Communicare Scientias (editor: Lars Broman), Acta Academiae Stromstadiensis, AAS-13, Strömstad akademi, 2013, Strömstad, Sweden, .
 Arreskowsläkten - inledning till en kulturhistorisk översikt - The Arreskow Cultural Heritage - an introduction. (Booklet reprint with abstract in English to celebrate The Arreskow Family Association semi-centennial celebration, Simrishamn August 16–18, 2013), Are Akademi, Växjö Stockholm, 2013, Sweden, .
 Parental Alienation: A Swedish Perspective - Introduction to a Transgenerational Case Study with Policy Recommendations. Book I: Towards a Resolution of the Controversy in Science and Society on Parental Alienation. Are Akademi Collegium Europaeum: Science in Society Observatory: Transdisciplinary Dialogues Working Papers. Stockholm, 2014, Sweden. 48 pages. .
 Strövtåg i tankens värld - om estetik och mening, Acta Academiae Stromstadiensis, AAS-27, Strömstad akademi, April 2014, Strömstad, Sweden. 14 pages. .

Compositions
Archived at Svensk Musik: selected compositions dated 1967 - 1990, listed by Swedish Music Information Centre (SMIC). Caveat: List not including recent compositions, early childhood music such as piano pieces from age 13, an early full score piano concerto (from the age of 15), and an orchestral score titled Requiem in memory of a prematurely deceased elder brother, composed at the age of 17-18.
 Concerto S:t George, concertino for piano and symphony orchestra (1990).
 Visor för barn, songs for children, single voice with harmonies (1983).
 Vaggvisa, voice and piano (1982).
 Julevisa, single voice with harmonies (1984).
 Invitazione ossia Sinfonia 2 : Emanuel Swedenborg in memoriam, symphony orchestra (1988).
 Perpetuum musicale, piano (1982).
 Senza misura 1, piano (1983).
 Soggetto antico, "per pianoforte", piano (1982).
 Triste, piano (1983).
 Reminiscenza, "per flauto solo", solo flute (1982).
 Hänryckning, 4-parts mixed choir (1967).
 Itération - isometrique - rhythmique : Improvisation for viola and pianoforte (1975).
 Veni sancte spiritus, 4-parts mixed choir and alternating soli/choir (1967).
 Two musigraphs = Två musigrafiska blad : Instrumental improvisation for optional instruments (1982).
 Tre sånger till texter av Alf Henrikson (author): Subtiliteter, Novembermorgon, Regnet skvalade, 3 songs for voice and piano (1982).
 Symphony for peace - text: poems by Dag Hammarskjöld, mixed choir and symphony orchestra (1985).

Award and prizes

 Kronoberg County Council Cultural Award
 Växjö Municipality and Community Cultural Prize

References

External links

Researchgate
Project Syndicate
KTH Portal (academic profile & links) KTH Royal Institute of Technology, Stockholm, Sweden
ETH Collection - ETH Institutional Repository, ETH Federal Institute of Technology, Zurich, Switzerland
University of Jyväskylä, Docent, Department of Music
Strömstad akademi - Institute for advanced studies: Fellows' publications and articles on debate forum
Are Akademi - Nordic Arena for Dialogue on Values: the interplay between science and arts, knowledge integration, creativity and competence for leadership in society, business, academia and culture
AreScope transdisciplinary dialogues: a blog on policy, macroeconomy and culture
Series of publications on the aesthetics of musical interpretation in performance of classical music
Aremus homepage

Swedish musicologists
Swedish composers
Swedish male composers
Living people
1951 births
20th-century Swedish physicians
20th-century Swedish musicians
20th-century Swedish male musicians